Pudhiya Pathai is a 1960 Indian Tamil-language film directed by Tapi Chanakya. The film stars Gemini Ganesan and Savithri. It is a remake of the Hindi film Ek Hi Raasta (1956). The film was simultaneously shot in Telugu as Kumkuma Rekha (1960).

Plot

Cast 
List adapted from the database of Film News Anandan.

Male cast
Gemini Ganesan
K. A. Thangavelu
A. Karunanidhi
K. Balaji
Balakrishnan

Female cast
Savithri
M. Saroja
Daisy Irani (as child artiste)
Sukumari
Jyothi

Production 

The film was directed by Tapi Chanakya, the story was written by Mukhram Sharma and Murasoli Maran wrote the dialogues. Cinematography was handled by Yoosuf Mulji. Vembatti Sathyam was the choreographer.

Soundtrack 
Music was composed by Master Venu, while the lyrics were penned by A. Maruthakasi and Kannadasan. The song "Aasaigal Malarvadhu Paruva Nenjile" is based on the tune of "Sawle Salone Aaye Din Baharke" from the 1956 Hindi film Ek Hi Raasta.

References

External links 

1960s Tamil-language films
Films directed by Tapi Chanakya
Films scored by Master Venu
Indian black-and-white films
Tamil remakes of Hindi films